Parliamentary elections were held in Slovakia on 18 December 1938 following the German occupation of Czechoslovakia.

Background
On 6 October 1938 Slovakia declared autonomy, with Hlinka's Slovak People's Party (HSĽS) becoming the dominant political party in Slovakia. Some parties were partially forced to merge with HSĽS, whilst others were forbidden (Jewish parties, the Social Democratic Party and the Communist Party) or their activities were suspended (e.g. Slovak National Party which refused to "voluntarily" join HSĽS). New Hlinka's Slovak People's Party - The Party of Slovak National Unity (HSĽS-SSNJ) then organized rigged elections to strengthen its position in Slovakia and for further negotiations with the central government.

The elections were announced in the afternoon on Saturday 26 November 1938. Political parties were required to register by the next day, but the information was only officially published on Monday and in the daily press the following Thursday. The campaign contained strong anti-Czech and anti-Jewish propaganda, with those seeking to vote against labelled as traitors.

Electoral system
The election took the form of a referendum, with voters asked only one question "Do you want a new, free Slovakia?" The elections were supervised by the Hlinka Guard, which had to find out how people voted. In many places, the government created separate polling stations for members of national minorities to trace their political preferences and "loyalty".

Voters were presented with a United List of 63 candidates, of whom 47 were members of the Slovak People's Party, four were from the former Agrarian Party, two from the German Party, one from the Hungarian minority and the remaining nine were members of former parties.

Results

Aftermath
Josef Tiso used the results for the reconstruction of the autonomous government, thus weakening the influence of other former parties which "voluntarily" joined HSĽS. The first session of the new Diet of the Slovak Land was held on 18 January 1939, with Martin Sokol elected as its chairman and Jozef Tiso as Prime Minister. On 14 March the Diet accepted independence, following Tiso's explanation of his discussions with Adolf Hitler in which the latter had ordered the Slovak government to declare independence.

Notes

References

1938 elections in Czechoslovakia
Parliamentary elections in Slovakia
Legislative elections in Czechoslovakia
Single-candidate elections
December 1938 events
Election and referendum articles with incomplete results